New York State Route 83 (NY 83) is a state route located entirely in Chautauqua County, New York in the United States. It extends from an intersection with U.S. Route 62 (US 62) in the hamlet of Conewango Valley (at the Cattaraugus County border) to NY 60 in the hamlet of Laona, near Fredonia. Along the way, NY 83 intersects with NY 322 at Balcom Corners and serves the hamlet of Cherry Creek.

NY 83 initially extended south to Frewsburg when it was assigned as part of the 1930 renumbering. The portion of the route between Frewsburg and Conewango Valley became part of US 62 , resulting in the truncation of NY 83 to its current southern terminus in the 1940s.

Route description

NY 83 begins at US 62 in the hamlet of Conewango Valley, located in the northeastern corner of the town of Ellington. The route heads north-northwestward, paralleling a pair of train tracks, and shortly after enters the hamlet of Cherry Creek, where it intersects County Route 70 (CR 70) and CR 68, respectively. Known as Main Street, it bows out to the east slightly, and subsequently takes on a due north path as it heads through the town of Cherry Creek. A couple miles later, it reaches the hamlet of Balcom Corners (located in the town of Villenova), a community situated at the junction of NY 83 and the western terminus of NY 322. Here, NY 83 turns westward toward the community of Hamlet, where it intersects with CR 72.

NY 83 begins a more erratic routing, passing between West Mud Lake and Black Pond as it enters the town of Arkwright. For a short distance it is concurrent with CR 85, and takes on the name Black Corner Street, so named because it is located within the hamlet of Black Corners. Although this portion of NY 83 is cosigned with CR 85, it is maintained by the New York State Department of Transportation. An intersection with CR 79 is not far off, as it passes just north of the town of Arkwright. NY 83 proceeds west-northwest until it reaches its ending terminus at NY 60 in the community of Laona, located just west of the Arkwright town line in Pomfret.

History
NY 83 was assigned as part of the 1930 renumbering of state highways in New York to an alignment extending from Frewsburg in the south to Laona in the north. US 62 was extended into New York , overlapping NY 83 from Frewsburg to Conewango Valley. The overlap was eliminated in the 1940s when NY 83 was truncated to its junction with US 62 in Conewango Valley.

Major intersections

See also

References

External links

083
Transportation in Chautauqua County, New York